King coconut (Cocos nucifera var aurantiaca) is a  variety of coconut, native to the Sri Lanka. The King Coconut also found in India and Indonesia. where it is known as Thæmbili (Sinhalaතැඹිලි). Less sugar content than regular coconuts, there are several sub varieties of the king coconut-the most common being the "red dwarf" (kaha thæmbili, commonly referred to as gon thæmbili). The other variety is "Ran Thæmbili", a smaller variety containing about forty nuts in a bunch. The king coconut tree is shorter than coconut trees, and are found commonly growing wild in many areas of the country.

The king coconut water, or liquid endosperm of young King coconut is a nutritious, natural beverage as it is rich in sugars (mainly reducing sugars), minerals (mainly K+), vitamins (mainly B & C) and amino acids. King coconut water has been used in Ayurveda (herbal medicine). One of the most common uses is a mixture of Aralu powder (Myrobalans) added to the water of a king coconut.

Sri Lanka now exports packaged king coconut water in a variety of brands.

There are many cultivated coconut varieties found in Sri Lanka. Most of them undergo research through the National Coconut Research Institute. According to research, the National Coconut Research Institute identified these varieties during a recent coconut germplasm exploration mission in the Southern Province of Sri Lanka.

Coconut in Sri Lanka is currently classified into 15 different forms grouped under three varieties,
namely 'Typica', 'Nana' and 'Aurantiaca'. The visual morphological features of several new coconut morphotypes were characterized with the objective of including them in the taxonomic classification of coconut in Sri Lanka. It is also found in some parts of Kerala, where it is known as (Chomana Thenga) or red coconut.

Varieties and forms of coconut found in Sri Lanka

See also
 Coconut

References

Coconuts